Bhishma is a character in the Mahabharata.

Bhishma may also refer to:

 Bhishma Parva or Book of Bhishma, sixth book of the Mahabharata
 Bhishma (1936 film), an Indian Hindu mythological film
 Bhishma (1962 film), a Telugu film
 Bhishma (1996 film), a Hindi film
 Bheeshma (2020 film), Telugu
 T-90 Bhishma, Russian tank design for Indian Armed Forces
 Bhishma Narain Singh (1933–2018), Indian politician
 Bhishma Shankar Tiwari (born 1960), an Indian politician

Masculine given names